Christopher "Chris" Lee Rawlinson (born 19 May 1972) is a former track and field athlete who competed in the 400 metre hurdles.

He also appeared in the 1995 series of the TV series Gladiators.

After trying the pole vault, decathlon and 110 m hurdles in his early career, Rawlinson found the gruelling 400 m hurdles to be his best event.

A graduate of Loughborough University, until 2020 Rawlinson held the world best of 34.48 seconds for the rarely run 300 m hurdles, which he set at Sheffield, England on 30 June 2002.

In July 2004 he ranked third on the United Kingdom all-time list for the 400 m hurdles with a time of 48.14 seconds, set in 1999 at Zurich, Switzerland. In the build-up to the 2004 Summer Olympics in Athens, Greece, Rawlinson was ranked number five in the world by the IAAF.

Rawlinson retired from competitive athletics at the end of 2005 at the age of 33.

He married Australian athlete Jana Pittman on 31 March 2006.

Now married to Catherine Clark, sports administrator, they have 2 sons.

International competitions

References

External links

1972 births
Living people
Sportspeople from Rotherham
English male hurdlers
Alumni of Loughborough University
Commonwealth Games gold medallists for England
Athletes (track and field) at the 2002 Commonwealth Games
Athletes (track and field) at the 2006 Commonwealth Games
Commonwealth Games medallists in athletics
World Athletics Championships athletes for Great Britain
Athletes (track and field) at the 2000 Summer Olympics
Athletes (track and field) at the 2004 Summer Olympics
Olympic athletes of Great Britain
Universiade medalists in athletics (track and field)
Gladiators (1992 British TV series)
Universiade silver medalists for Great Britain
Universiade bronze medalists for Great Britain
Medalists at the 1999 Summer Universiade
Medallists at the 2002 Commonwealth Games